The National Extremism Tactical Co-ordination Unit (NETCU) was a British police organisation funded by, and reporting to, the Association of Chief Police Officers (ACPO) that coordinated police action against groups in the United Kingdom it described as extremist.

Structure
As of April 2007, it was headed by Superintendent Steve Pearl. Because the ACPO was not a public body but rather a private limited company, NETCU was exempt from freedom of information laws and other kinds of public accountability, even though they were funded by the Home Office and deployed police officers from regional forces.

Background
"NETCU provides tactical advice and guidance on policing single-issue domestic extremism. The unit also supports companies and other organisations that are the targets of domestic extremism campaigns. NETCU reports through the National Coordinator for Domestic Extremism (NCDE) to the Association of Chief Police Officers Terrorism and Allied Matters - ACPO(TAM) committee."

NETCU answered to the Association of Chief Police Officers' (ACPO) Terrorism and Allied Matters Committee, and in particular to ACPO's National Coordinator for Domestic Extremism, Detective Chief Superintendent Adrian Tudway. It worked with the Home Office, and the National Public Order Intelligence Unit.

The unit was created in or around May 2004 to coordinate police action in relation to animal rights campaigns. It was based in Huntingdon, Cambridgeshire, which had been a focal point for animal rights activism as a result of the Stop Huntingdon Animal Cruelty campaign.

Apart from animal rights groups, it also investigated the UK Life League, a direct action anti-abortion group that protests outside abortion clinics.

Takeover by the Metropolitan Police
In November 2010 it was announced that the three ACPO units commanded by the National Domestic Extremism and Disorder Intelligence Unit would be rebranded as the National Domestic Extremism Unit and brought under the control of the Metropolitan Police by Summer 2011.

See also
 National Public Order Intelligence Unit

Notes

Further reading
 NETCU website archived at the Internet Archive
 Glover, Julian; Adam, David; and Ward, David. "Anger over 'victory' for animal rights campaign", The Guardian, 24 August 2005
 "Animal rights protesters", Hansard, 20 May 2004
 Cox, Simon and Vadon, Richard. "How animal rights took on the world", BBC Radio 4, 18 November 2004.

Association of Chief Police Officers
Animal rights
National law enforcement agencies of the United Kingdom
Huntingdon
Organisations based in Cambridgeshire
Government agencies established in 2004
Government agencies disestablished in 2011